Massachusetts House of Representatives' 22nd Middlesex district in the United States is one of 160 legislative districts included in the lower house of the Massachusetts General Court. It covers the town of Billerica in Middlesex County. Republican Marc Lombardo of Billerica has represented the district since 2011.

The current district geographic boundary overlaps with that of the Massachusetts Senate's 4th Middlesex district.

Representatives
 Dana Holden, circa 1858 
 Jacob Coggin, circa 1859 
 Francis W. Qua, circa 1888 
 Harry C Woodill, circa 1920 
 Charles Gibbons, circa 1951 
 Joseph A. Milano, circa 1951 
 Theodore Jack Vaitses, circa 1951 
 Robert M. Penta, circa 1975 
 William Cass
 Brian Cresta
 William G. Greene Jr.
 Marc T. Lombardo, 2011-current

Former locale
The district previously covered Woburn, circa 1872.

See also
 List of Massachusetts House of Representatives elections
 List of Massachusetts General Courts
 List of former districts of the Massachusetts House of Representatives
 Other Middlesex County districts of the Massachusetts House of Representatives: 1st, 2nd, 3rd, 4th, 5th, 6th, 7th, 8th, 9th, 10th, 11th, 12th, 13th, 14th, 15th, 16th, 17th, 18th, 19th, 20th, 21st, 23rd, 24th, 25th, 26th, 27th, 28th, 29th, 30th, 31st, 32nd, 33rd, 34th, 35th, 36th, 37th

Images
Portraits of legislators

References

External links
 Ballotpedia
  (State House district information based on U.S. Census Bureau's American Community Survey).

House
Government of Middlesex County, Massachusetts